The Capitol is a 1919 American silent drama film directed by George Irving and starring Leah Baird, Robert T. Haines and Alexander Gaden.

Cast
 Leah Baird as Margaret Kennard / Agnes Blake
 Robert T. Haines as Eustace Kennard
 Alexander Gaden as James Carroll
 William B. Davidson as Congressman Blake
 Downing Clarke as Henry Garretson 
 Ben Hendricks Sr. as James Lamar 
 Donald MacBride as Jimmy Vincent
 Mildred Rhoads as Baby Kennard

References

Bibliography
 Goble, Alan. The Complete Index to Literary Sources in Film. Walter de Gruyter, 1999.

External links
 

1919 films
1919 drama films
1910s English-language films
American silent feature films
Silent American drama films
American black-and-white films
Films directed by George Irving
Films distributed by W. W. Hodkinson Corporation
Pathé Exchange films
1910s American films